Nicotania acaulis is a Nicotiana species of wild tobacco. It is native to Argentina and Chile.

References

Flora of Argentina
Flora of Chile
acaulis
Plants described in 1902